Logan Road, allocated state routes 95 and 30, is a major road in Brisbane, Queensland. It runs  from Springwood in  Logan City to Woolloongabba in Brisbane, with most of the route signed as state route 95. The route was formerly the main route to the Gold Coast from Brisbane, until the South East Freeway (now Pacific Motorway) was built.

The road runs close to the Gabba and Greenslopes Private Hospital, Mount Gravatt, past Westfield Garden City and the Upper Mount Gravatt busway station. Logan Road provides the quickest access to Mount Gravatt from the south, as well as being the main access road for the Westfield Garden City Shopping Centre.  At the road's southern extent it is crossed by both the Pacific Motorway and Gateway Motorway.  At Underwood Kingston Road splits off to become a major road into central Logan City.

History

William Slack, a local cattle grazier, took his stock along a possible Aboriginal track which became known to the locals as Slacks Track. Later the track became a road and then highway.

The route takes its name from Captain Patrick Logan, one of the founders of the Moreton Bay convict settlement. Its route is similar to that of the Pacific Motorway and can be accessed directly via exit numbers 20 and 14 as well as by the Gateway Motorway.

The first electric trams travelled along the road in 1897.   The service ran into the city to its terminus at the southern side of the Victoria Bridge.  Between 1953 and 1969, electric trams ran along Logan Road between Woolloongabba and Mount Gravatt.

At the northern end of Logan Road is the Woolloongabba Fiveways.  This intersection was one of the busiest in the city, requiring a policeman to coordinate rail and road traffic.

Major intersections
The road is in the Brisbane local government area, except the last 3.3 kilometres, which are in Logan City.

See also

 Ipswich Road
 Old Cleveland Road
 Road transport in Brisbane

References

External links

Roads in Brisbane
Logan City